Juanito Sequeira (born 14 March 1982) is a Dutch professional footballer who plays as a midfielder for ASWH. Sequeira has formerly played for Excelsior, FC Dordrecht and Helmond Sport.

References

External links
 Voetbal International profile 
 

1982 births
Living people
Dutch footballers
Dutch people of Cape Verdean descent
Helmond Sport players
FC Dordrecht players
Excelsior Rotterdam players
Achilles '29 players
Eerste Divisie players
Footballers from Rotterdam
Association football midfielders
ASWH players